Elhadji Ousseynou Ndoye (born 10 April 1992) is a Senegalese professional footballer who played as a centre back . He has previously played in Belgium and Kazakhstan with Zulte Waregem, RWDM Brussels, R.W.S. Bruxelles, and FC Kyzylzhar.

Career
Ndoye began his career with Belgian side Zulte Waregem in 2013 but was loaned out to Belgian Second Division side RWDM Brussels. He made his debut for the side on 16 February 2013 against K.S.V. Roeselare. He started the match and played it in its entirety as RWDM Brussels drew the match 1–1. Ndoye was soon loaned again to the second division, this time to R.W.S. Bruxelles. He made his debut for the side on 4 August 2013 against Verbroedering Geel. He started and played the whole match as R.W.S. won 2–1.

Ndoye soon left Zulte Waregem and Belgium to move to Kazakhstani side FC Kyzylzhar. After a season in Kazakhstan, Ndoye moved to India to sign for Indian Super League side Kerala Blasters. He made his debut for the side on 5 October 2016 against Atlético de Kolkata. He started and played the whole match as Kerala Blasters lost 1–0.

Ndoye signed for Naxxar Lions in the Malta Premier League in September 2017 and collected a Man of the Match award in his first game against Valletta FC.

References

External links 
 Indian Super League Profile.

1992 births
Expatriate footballers in Malta
Maltese Premier League players
Naxxar Lions F.C. players
Living people
Senegalese footballers
Kerala Blasters FC players
Association football defenders
Indian Super League players
Expatriate footballers in India
Al-Orobah FC players
Saudi First Division League players
Expatriate footballers in Saudi Arabia
Senegalese expatriate sportspeople in Saudi Arabia